A List of eastern shore communities on the Gulf of California.

North

Sonora
Puerto Peñasco
El Desemboque
Punta Chueca
Puerto Libertad
Kino Nuevo
Bahía Kino
San Carlos, Sonora
Guaymas
San Carlos Nuevo Guaymas
Bácum
Empalme, Sonora
San Ignacio Río Muerto
Villa Juárez
Huatabampo
Punta Rosa Yávaros
Los Bocas
Sonora
Sinaloa
Higuera de Zaragoza
Ahome
Ahome, Sinaloa
Los Mochis
Topolobampo
Las Glorias
La Reforma
Navolato, Sinaloa
Altata
El Dorado, Sinaloa
La Cruz, Sinaloa
Dimas
Mazatlán
Sinaloa

South

Gulf of California